is a Japanese VOCALOID musical group. The group started uploading their original VOCALOID songs online to NicoNico in 2010 and began to collaborate with singer CHiCO in May 2014 (CHiCO with HoneyWorks), which they maintain to this day. They made a major debut in January 2014 and continue to be popular. They are the creators of the Kokuhaku Jikkō Iinkai: Ren'ai Series Vocaloid song project.

Members

Main
 Gom (composer)
 shito (composer) 
 Yamako (illustrator)

Supporting
 Oji (guitar, joined in 2012) 
 ziro (staff, joined in 2014) 
  (keyboard, joined in 2014)
 AtsuyuK! (drum, joined in 2014) 
  (Illustrator and video editor, joined in 2014) 
  (guitar, 2017)
 kyo (guitar)
  (drum)
  (composer and manipulator)
 Keoru (composer)
 Hanon (vocals)
 Kotoha (vocals)
 halyosy (vocals)

Former
  (illustrator, 2013–2019)

Television
HoneyWorks' songs have been featured as an opening/ending song in the following anime television shows:

Openings
2014: "Sekai wa Koi ni Ochiteiru" for Blue Spring Ride
2015: "Ai No Scenario" for Magic Kaito 1412 (Episodes #13 to 24)
2015: "Pride Kakumei" for Gintama
2017: "Twins" for PriPri Chi-chan!!
2017: "Kyou Mo Sakura Mau Akatsuki Ni" for Gintama
2018: "Nostalgic Rainfall" for After the Rain
2019: "Otome-domo Yo" for O Maidens in Your Savage Season
2021: "Minikui Ikimono" for Otherside Picnic
2021: "Gamushara" for Boruto: Naruto Next Generations (Episode #206 onwards)
2022: "Himitsu Koigokoro" for Rent-A-Girlfriend

Endings
2018: "Hikari Shoumeiron" for Gintama
2020: "Kessen Spirit" for Haikyū!! To The Top
2021: "Bōken no Vlog (A Vlog of the Journey)" for Edens Zero (Episodes #2 to 12)
2022: "Bibitto Love" for Science Fell in Love, So I Tried to Prove It
Also, a TV anime Itsu Datte Bokura no Koi wa 10 senchi Datta (Our Love Has Always Been 10 Centimeters Apart) that featured HoneyWorks' story and songs started its 6-week program on November 24, 2017.

Movies
HoneyWorks songs have been featured as an opening/ending/insert song in the following movies:

 "Tsunoru Kimochi" for Principal ~Koi Suru Watashi wa Heroine desu ka?~
 "Principal No Kimi E" for Principal ~Koi Suru Watashi wa Heroine desu ka?~
 "Oni no Mori" for Jukai Mura

HoneyWorks songs have been the inspiration for two movies, Zutto Mae Kara Suki Deshita and Suki ni Naru Sono Shunkan o. Both heavily incorporate the band's songs.

Discography

Albums

CHiCO with HoneyWorks

Albums

Singles

References

Japanese musical groups